Massimo d'Azeglio (1798–1866) was an Italian statesman, novelist and painter.

D'Azeglio may also refer to:
Liceo Classico Massimo d'Azeglio, a high school in Turin, Italy

People with the surname
Roberto d'Azeglio (1790–1862), Italian painter
Vittorio Emanuele Taparelli d'Azeglio (1816–1890), Italian diplomat

See also
Azeglio
Azeglio Vicini